German submarine U-591 was a Type VIIC U-boat built for Nazi Germany's Kriegsmarine for service during World War II.
She was laid down on 30 October 1940 by Blohm & Voss, Hamburg as yard number 567, launched on 20 August 1941 and commissioned on 9 October 1941 under Kapitänleutnant Hans-Jürgen Zetzsche.

Design
German Type VIIC submarines were preceded by the shorter Type VIIB submarines. U-591 had a displacement of  when at the surface and  while submerged. She had two shafts and two  propellers.

U-591 was fitted with five  torpedo tubes (four fitted at the bow and one at the stern), fourteen torpedoes, one  SK C/35 naval gun, 220 rounds, and a  C/30 anti-aircraft gun. The boat had a complement of between forty-four and sixty.

Service history
The boat's service began on 9 October 1941 with training, followed by active service as part of the 6th U-boat Flotilla. She was transferred to the 11th Flotilla on 1 July 1942 for active service in the North Atlantic operating out of Bergen. The following year, on 1 June 1943, she transferred to 9th Flotilla operating of Brest, France.

Convoy ONS 154
The first victim of Convoy ONS 154 was the 5,701-GRT Norwegian freighter Norse King, the second in column eleven, on 28 December 1942. U-591 torpedo hit her at 20:04.
U-591’s second success was the badly damaged and abandoned 4,871-GRT United Africa Company freighter Zarian with a single torpedo, although she missed the Baron Cochrane

Convoy SC 121
Having recently returned to sea after a long recovery from gunshot wounds, Hans-Jürgen Zetzsche was on target with Convoy SC 121 when he sighted the Empire Impala, hove-to picking up survivors from the torpedoed Egyptian, on 7 March 1943. Of the combined crew of 80 men, from both Egyptian and Empire Impala, only 3 survived.

Fate
U-591 was sunk on 30 July 1943 in the South Atlantic near Pernambuco in position ; depth charged by a US Lockheed Ventura aircraft of VB-127. There were 19 dead and 28 survivors.

Wolfpacks
U-591 took part in nine wolfpacks, namely:
 Schlei (21 January – 12 February 1942)
 Bums (6 – 10 April 1942)
 Greif (14 – 29 May 1942)
 Nebelkönig (27 July – 13 August 1942)
 Ungestüm (11 – 30 December 1942)
 Sturmbock (21 – 26 February 1943)
 Wildfang (26 February – 5 March 1943)
 Westmark (6 – 11 March 1943)
 Seewolf (21 – 30 March 1943)

Summary of raiding history

References

Bibliography

External links

German Type VIIC submarines
1941 ships
U-boats commissioned in 1941
U-boats sunk by depth charges
U-boats sunk by US aircraft
U-boats sunk in 1943
World War II submarines of Germany
World War II shipwrecks in the Atlantic Ocean
World War II shipwrecks in the South Atlantic
Ships built in Hamburg
Maritime incidents in July 1943